Khristos Khristoforou (born 1 November 1971) is a Cypriot sailor. He competed in the men's 470 event at the 1988 Summer Olympics.

References

External links
 

1971 births
Living people
Cypriot male sailors (sport)
Olympic sailors of Cyprus
Sailors at the 1988 Summer Olympics – 470
Place of birth missing (living people)